Austral 20 was a  catamaran produced by Charles Cunningham in Australia in the early 1960s period of experimentation.

It was apparently produced in reasonable numbers by Charles himself.

See also
List of multihulls
Lock Crowther

References

Catamarans